The Algiers Tramway (Tramwāy al-Jazā'ir al-`Āṣimah, "Algiers Capital Tramway") is a tram system which commenced service on 8 May 2011 in the Algerian capital, Algiers.

Overview

The tramway is designed to carry between 150,000 and 185,000 people per day. The system offers a carrying capacity of 6,800 passengers per hour in each direction with a capacity of 400 persons per tram. The light rail vehicles (LRVs) being used are Alstom Citadis trams, specifically the second-generation Type 302. EMA has ordered 41 trams. The first set was delivered on March 28, 2009.

The design of the trams was carried out by the agency RCP Design Global which covered the general concept, indoor environment and the outer casing of the trams. The livery of trams is blue and white.

Stations

See also 
 Algiers Metro
 List of town tramway systems in Africa
 Template:Suburban railways in Africa

References

External links
 ETUSA – official website 

Light rail in Algeria
Tram transport in Algeria
Public inquiries in Algeria
Tramway
Rail transport articles in need of updating
RATP Group
2011 establishments in Algeria